Christopher de Lerisson Cazenove (17 December 1943 – 7 April 2010) was an English film, television and stage actor.

Early life and career
He was born Christopher de Lerisson Cazenove, on 17 December 1943, the son of Brigadier Arnold de Lerisson Cazenove and Elizabeth Laura (née Gurney, 1914–1994) in Winchester, Hampshire, but was brought up in Bowlish, Somerset. He was educated at the Dragon School, Eton College, Durham University's College of the Venerable Bede and the Bristol Old Vic Theatre School.

Cazenove often portrayed British aristocrats, and first made his name in the 1972 drama series, The Regiment. Other notable roles included Charlie Tyrrell in the 1976-77 period drama series The Duchess of Duke Street, and in 1986 he appeared as Ben Carrington in the US soap opera Dynasty, which he played until the following year. From 2001-03, he had a recurring role in the British drama series Judge John Deed, playing Row Colemore.

On the stage, he appeared as Henry Higgins in the British and American productions of My Fair Lady from 2005 through to 2008. He also starred in the London West End production of The Importance of Being Earnest in 1994 alongside Susannah York.

Personal life
Cazenove was married to actress Angharad Rees from 1973 until their divorce in 1994. They had two sons, Linford James (20 July 1974 — 10 September 1999); and Rhys William (born 1976); Linford died in a car crash on the M11 in Essex. From 2003 until his death, Cazenove's partner was Isabel Davis.

Death
In February 2010, Cazenove collapsed at his London home. He was taken to St Thomas' Hospital in London, suffering from septicaemia. He died on 7 April 2010 from the effects of the illness at St Thomas's Hospital, aged 66. The actor "died peacefully surrounded by his loved ones", said a statement released by his agent, his family and girlfriend.

Cazenove's funeral on 16 April 2010 was held at St Paul's, Covent Garden, London.

Filmography

Film

Television
 1972-1973 The Regiment
 1973 Omnibus: The British Hero (BBC TV documentary/selected dramatised scenes) as Heroes: Tom Brown / Richard Hannay / Beau Geste / Bulldog Drummond / James Bond
 1974 Thriller Episode: "K is for Killing" as Sunny Garrick
 1974 Jennie, Lady Randolph Churchill as George Cornwallis-West
 1976-1977 Duchess of Duke Street as Charlie Tyrrell
 1980 Hammer House of Horror Episode: "Children of the Full Moon" as Tom Martin
 1981 Ladykillers Episode: A Smile is Sometimes Worth a Million Dollars as Ronald True
 1982 The Letter (1982 film) as Officer Withers 
 1984 Hammer House of Mystery and Suspense Episode: "In Possession" as Frank Daly
 1985 Kane & Abel as The Baron
 1986-1987 Dynasty as Ben Carrington
 1989 A Fine Romance (1989 TV series) as Michael Trent
 2001-2003 Judge John Deed as "Row" Colemore
 2005 Dalziel and Pascoe Episode: "Dead Meat", Parts 1 and 2 as Guy Latimer

References

External links
 
 BBC profile 
 NY Times filmography
 Obituary in The Daily Telegraph
 Obituary in The Times

1943 births
2010 deaths
20th-century English male actors
21st-century English male actors
Alumni of Bristol Old Vic Theatre School
Deaths from sepsis
English male film actors
English male stage actors
English male television actors
Infectious disease deaths in England
People educated at The Dragon School
People educated at Eton College
Actors from Winchester
Male actors from Hampshire
People from Shepton Mallet
Male actors from Somerset
Gurney family
Alumni of the College of the Venerable Bede, Durham